The American Journal of Gastroenterology is a peer reviewed medical journal owned by the American College of Gastroenterology. It has been published by Lippincott Williams & Wilkins since 2019 and was previously published by Nature Research, Blackwell and (before 2004) Elsevier.

References

External links

English-language journals
Gastroenterology and hepatology journals
Monthly journals
Lippincott Williams & Wilkins academic journals
Publications established in 1934
Academic journals associated with learned and professional societies of the United States